Ascending artery may refer to:

 Ascending palatine artery, an artery in the head that branches off the facial artery.
 Ascending pharyngeal artery, an artery in the neck that supplies the pharynx.
 Ascending cervical artery, a small artery which arises from the inferior thyroid artery